Wipro Enterprises Private Limited (stylized as Wipro Enterprises)  is a privately held Indian company whose main activities are in the fast-moving consumer goods, lighting,  hydraulic cylinders, industrial automation, 3D printing and aerospace component manufacturing and industrial water treatment business. It is almost entirely owned by Azim Premji, his associates, and his charitable associations. Revenues of the company stood at US$1.44 billion in 2020–21. The company was founded in 2013 as a spin-off of Wipro Limited's non-IT businesses.

Subsidiaries

Wipro Consumer Care and Lighting
Wipro Consumer Care and Lighting (WCCLG) caters to the fast-moving consumer goods (FMCG) segment dealing in personal care, home care, lighting and seating solutions. Established as Western India Vegetable Products in 1945, its first product was vegetable oil, later sold under the brand name "Sunflower Vanaspati." Later the company also launched laundry bars under the brand name "787". It has gone on to sell personal care products like Santoor, Chandrika, Aramusk and Yardley, which are its toilet soap brands. It also owns the Wipro Safewash, Softouch, Maxkleen and Giffy range of home care products. The firm also sells lighting products that include Garnet LED lights. and Smartlite CFL.

Through product sales and acquisitions, Wipro Consumer Care and Lighting has grown steadily in the FMCG segment in Asia. Its turnover as of March 2022 was Rs. 8634.6 Crore (US$1.16 billion)

Mergers and acquisitions - Consumer Care Business 
2003 - Glucovita brand from HLL.

2003 - Chandrika Soap

2006 - Northwest Switches for Rs. 102.2 crore.

2007 - Singapore-based Unza Holdings for ₹1,010 crore.

2009 - Yardley India and Middle East business (undisclosed sum).

2011 - Aramusk 

2011 - Yardley global business

2013 - L D Waxsons, Singapore Rs.790 crore

2016 -  Zhongshan Ma Er, China 

2019 - Splash Corporation, Philippines

2019 - Canway Corporation, South Africa

Wipro Consumer Care Ventures 
In September 2019, Wipro Consumer Care and Lighting launched Wipro Consumer Care Ventures, a venture fund to invest in startups in India and Southeast Asia. The company has invested in 7 companies in India including a few D2C brands. In March 2022, Consumer Care Ventures invested in a Singapore-based VC fund.

Wipro Infrastructure Engineering (WIN)
Wipro Infrastructure Engineering is the hydraulics business division of the firm and has been in the business of manufacturing hydraulic cylinders, truck cylinders, and their components since being established in 1976 as part of Wipro. It also includes the company's industrial water treatment business. This division delivers hydraulic cylinders to international OEMs . 

In 2006, Sweden-based Hydrauto Group AB was acquired by Hydraulics business for ₹142.6 crore.

In 2011 acquired Brazil-based hydraulic cylinder manufacturer RKM Equipamentos Hidraulicos. In the same year entered a joint venture with Kawasaki Precision Machinery Pvt. Ltd. to manufacture hydraulic pumps for excavators in 2011.

2013 SC Hervil SA in Romania was acquired.

In 2016 the business acquired Israel-based Givon HR in Aerospace business. In 2021, the Aerospace business set up a new manufacturing facility in Bengaluru.

2017 - tied up with Israel Aerospace Industries to manufacture composite aerostructure parts and assemblies.

Wipro 3D, which is also a part of Wipro Infrastructure Engineering, is India's largest fully integrated metal additive manufacturing facility.

In 2018, WIN set up Industrial Automation business as a new venture. The business acquired Incite Cam's automation business in 2019  In 2020 the business acquired Pune-based Precision Automation and Robotics India (PARI).

Social initiatives 
In 2020, during the pandemic, Wipro Enterprises along with Wipro Limited and the Azim Premji Foundation committed Rs 1,125 crore to tackle the coronavirus crisis.

Wipro Enterprises’ Santoor Scholarship Program contributes to girl education among the underprivileged in Karnataka, Telangana and Andhra Pradesh. 

Wipro Cares is the social contribution arm of Wipro Enterprises. It is engaged in areas such as education, primary healthcare, environment and disaster rehabilitation.

Awards and recognition 
In 2010, Wipro Lighting won Design for Asia award in the product design category for its LED streetlights.

In 2016, Wipro Lighting won India Design Mark for Certified Excellence in Product Design.

In 2017, Wipro Lighting won International Diamond Prize for Excellence in Quality by European Society of Quality Research. In the same year, it won, Red Dot Design award for outstanding design, Global SSL Showcase Top100, India Design Mark for certified excellence in Product Design, and Frost & Sullivan award for LED lighting visionary innovation leadership.

In 2019 Wipro 3D won Frost & Sullivan Automotive Additive Engineering and Manufacturing award

References 

Companies based in Bangalore
Holding companies of India
Year of establishment missing